The New Zealand national cricket team toured Australia in the 1985-86 season and played 3 Test matches against Australia.  New Zealand won the series 2-1.

This is the New Zealanders only series victory to date in Australia and the architect was Richard Hadlee who took an outstanding 33 wickets in 3 Tests.

In the first Test at Brisbane he took 9-52 in the Australians first innings and a further 6-71 in the second. 15 wickets in the match. In the third test in Perth he took 11 more wickets.

Test series summary

First Test

Second Test

Third Test

World Series Cup

New Zealanders also played in the Benson and Hedges World Series Cup in that season alongside Australia and India. They finished third and did not qualify for the best of three finals.

External sources
ESPNcricinfo

References
 Playfair Cricket Annual
 Wisden Cricketers Almanack 

1985 in Australian cricket
1985 in New Zealand cricket
1985–86 Australian cricket season
1986 in Australian cricket
1986 in New Zealand cricket
International cricket competitions from 1985–86 to 1988
1985-86